Kewanee is a city in Henry County, Illinois, United States. "Kewanee" is the Winnebago word for greater prairie chicken, which lived there. The population was 12,509 at the 2020 census, down from 12,944 in 2000.

Geography

Demographics

2000 census
At the 2000 census there were 12,944 people in 5,353 households, including 3,377 families, in the city. The racial makeup of the city was 90.27% White, 3.68% African American, 0.06% Native American, 0.35% Asian, 0.02% Pacific Islander, 3.69% from other races, and 1.95% from two or more races. Hispanic or Latino of any race were 6.10%.

Of the 5,353 households 28.5% had children under the age of 18 living with them, 47.0% were married couples living together, 12.3% had a female householder with no husband present, and 36.9% were non-families. 32.2% of households were one person and 17.7% were one person aged 65 or older.  The average household size was 2.38 and the average family size was 2.98.

The age distribution was 24.8% under the age of 18, 8.9% from 18 to 24, 25.4% from 25 to 44, 20.5% from 45 to 64, and 20.5% 65 or older.  The median age was 38 years. For every 100 females, there were 88.8 males.  For every 100 females age 18 and over, there were 84.7 males.

The median household income was $29,895 and the median family income  was $37,730. Males had a median income of $29,065 versus $19,792 for females. The per capita income for the city was $15,746.  About 10.7% of families and 13.9% of the population were below the poverty line, including 21.0% of those under age 18 and 8.9% of those age 65 or over.

2010 census
According to the 2020 census, the city had a population of 12,509.  Of this, 11,241 (87.03%) were white, 633 (4.90%) were black or African American, 624 (4.83%) were some other race, 325 (2.52%) were two or more races, 51 (0.39%) were Asian, 38 (0.29%) were American Indian or Alaska Native. 1,350 (10.45%) were Hispanic or Latino of any race.

Industry

Kewanee was once known for its fire-tube boiler industry. The Kewanee Boiler Corporation manufactured and sold boilers throughout the world for over one hundred years. The company shuttered in 2002, however, boilers manufactured in Kewanee are still in common use. The Kewanee High School athletic teams are nicknamed the "Boilermakers".

Kewanee was home to minor league baseball. The Kewanee Boilermakers minor league baseball team played in the Central Association from 1908–1913. In 1948–1949, the Kewanee A's rejoined the Central Association. Kewanee was an affiliate of the Philadelphia Athletics (1948–1949). Kewanee minor league teams played at Terminal Park (1908–1913) and Northeast Park (1948–1949).

Parks
Kewanee has many different types of parks in the immediate area, offering a variety of activities such as boating, camping, hunting, fishing, playgrounds, baseball fields, and more. Parks inside the city limits are run by the Kewanee Park District.

Schools
Kewanee has had two school districts, dating to when the community of Wethersfield was a separate municipality.  Though the towns merged long ago, the two school districts both remain in the city of 13,400, divided at Division Street in the middle of Kewanee. While Kewanee School District #229 has around 2,015 students (533 High School), Wethersfield #230 has about 600 students. The two schools enjoy a usually friendly rivalry, since both district high schools are in different divisions for most sports. However, this rivalry did become very heated in the sports the two high schools once competed in, most notably basketball. Black Hawk College-East Campus is recognized nationally for its equestrian program, as well as livestock judging teams. (Another Campus is located in the Quad Cities.)

Festivals
The most notable festival held in the community is Hog Days.  It is held annually on Labor Day weekend. Events include a carnival, mud volleyball, a parade, and more.

Local media

FM radio
 93.9 KQCJ "Planet 93.9", Alternative
 102.1 W271BL (Jack FM), Jack FM
 102.5 WJRE "HOG Country 102.5", Country (RDS)
 104.7 W284CV "Rock2.0", Rock
 100.1 W282AL (Translates 1450 WKEI), News/Talk

AM radio
 1450 WKEI, News/Talk

Newspapers
 Star Courier

Notable businesses

 Hotel Kewanee
 Sandy's Drive-In National Headquarters

Notable people 

 Walter T. Bailey (1882–1941), architect. Born and raised in Kewanee, Bailey was the first African-American graduate of the University of Illinois' School of Architecture.
 B. Frank Baker (1864–1939), member of the Illinois Senate, was a resident of Kewanee and served as its mayor.
 Neville Brand (1920-1992), actor and decorated World War II veteran
 Mike Cernovich (born 1977), media personality.
 W. K. Davidson (1904-1974), Illinois state representative, senator and restaurateur.
 Edward Robb Ellis (1911-1998), journalist and diarist
 Richard Estes (born 1932), artist
 Frederick Dilley Glidden (pen name Luke Short), Western writer, known for Ramrod (1947) and Blood on the Moon (1948)
 Bill Goffrier, guitarist for The Embarrassment
 Belden Hill (1864-1934), MLB third baseman for the Baltimore Orioles
 Em Lindbeck (1934-2008), MLB outfielder for the Detroit Tigers, mayor of Kewanee 
 Glenn McDonald (born 1952), NBA small forward / shooting guard for the Boston Celtics and Milwaukee Bucks
 Amber McReynolds (born 1979), chief executive of the National Vote at Home Institute and member of the Board of Governors of the United States Postal Service, was raised in Kewanee.
 Albinus Nance (1848-1911), 4th governor of Nebraska, was raised in Kewanee
 Dennis Nelson, professional football player
 Sod Ryan (1905-1964), NFL tackle for the Chicago Bears
 Lindsay Stalzer (born 1984), professional volleyball player, was raised in Kewanee.
 Marjabelle Young Stewart (1924–2007), writer and expert on etiquette, moved to Kewanee in 1965 and resided there until her 2007 death.
 Teresa Sullivan (born 1949), President of the University of Virginia (2010–2018), was raised in Kewanee.
 Dale Whittaker, fifth President of the University of Central Florida

Transportation
The Kewanee Amtrak station serves trains on the Carl Sandburg and Illinois Zephyr daily. The current station was completed April 13, 2012.

References

External links
 City of Kewanee

 
Cities in Illinois
Cities in Henry County, Illinois
Populated places established in 1854
1854 establishments in Illinois